The 52nd Academy of Country Music Awards, also known as the 2017 ACM Awards, were held at the T-Mobile Arena in Las Vegas, Nevada on April 2, 2017. Nominations for the 52nd Academy of Country Music Awards were announced on February 16, 2017. Luke Bryan returned to host the show for his fifth consecutive year, with co-host Dierks Bentley returning for his second consecutive year.

Winners and Nominations 
The winners are shown in bold.

Performances
Source:

See also

Academy of Country Music Awards

References

Academy of Country Music Awards
Academy of Country Music Awards
Academy of Country Music Awards
Academy of Country Music Awards
Academy of Country Music Awards
Academy of Country Music Awards